Anti-communist resistance in Poland may refer to:
 Anti-communist resistance in Poland (1944–1953), armed partisan struggle
 Anti-communist resistance in Poland (1944–1989), armed partisan struggle and the non-violent, civil resistance struggle